Jonathan Michael Lovitz (born July 21, 1957) is an American actor and comedian. He was a cast member of Saturday Night Live from 1985 to 1990. Lovitz starred as Jay Sherman in The Critic and played a baseball scout in A League of Their Own. He has appeared in 20 episodes of The Simpsons.

Early life
Lovitz was born on July 21, 1957, in the Tarzana neighborhood of Los Angeles, to Harold and Barbara Lovitz. His family is Jewish, and emigrated from Romania, Hungary, and Russia. His paternal grandfather, Feivel Ianculovici, left Romania around 1914. After arriving in the United States, he Americanized his name to Phillip Lovitz.

In a 2011 interview, Lovitz described his comedic influences:
"When I was 13, I saw Woody Allen's movie Take The Money and Run, and I wanted to be a comedian. Then when I was 16, I saw the movie Lenny, about Lenny Bruce, starring Dustin Hoffman. I thought the movie was so great, and I'd never heard of Lenny, so I went to the record store because I wanted to hear the real guy. Then I saw that Woody Allen had a record. I didn't know he had been a standup. So, I bought Woody Allen: The Nightclub Years, '64-'68. I learned their routines and performed them at my college dorm. That was at U.C. Irvine. I was a drama major there. In imitating their routines, I learned a lot about writing. You learn how to write a joke. I was influenced by them a lot, the way I say something, the timing or whatever. Or Jack Benny, sometimes I'll go, 'Well....'"

In college, Lovitz was friends with David Kudrow, brother of Lisa Kudrow, and went on a backpacking trip across Europe and Israel with him in 1978. He graduated with a bachelor's degree in drama in 1979, then studied acting with Tony Barr at the Film Actors Workshop. He became a member of the Groundlings comedy troupe, where he befriended his future SNL castmate Phil Hartman.

Career

Saturday Night Live
Lovitz was a cast member of Saturday Night Live from 1985 to 1990. He later said in an interview for the book Live From New York: An Uncensored History of Saturday Night Live that his time on SNL was the most memorable in his career. He went from having no money to being offered a $500,000 film contract. He was nominated for an Emmy Award his first two years on Saturday Night Live. One of his most notable SNL characters was "Tommy Flanagan, The Pathological Liar" who used an old Humphrey Bogart line "Yeah! That's the ticket!" as a catchphrase to punctuate painfully elaborated implausible lies. His other recurring characters and impersonations included Annoying Man, Master Thespian, Tonto, Mephistopheles, Harvey Fierstein, and Michael Dukakis. In a 1986 SNL episode, he portrayed a virgin Trekkie, who was scripted to hang his head when asked by William Shatner if he had ever kissed a girl.

Hanukkah Harry, one of Lovitz's most memorable roles, cast him in 1989 as a Jewish contemporary of Santa Claus who lives on Mount Sinai and travels the globe with a cart flown by three donkeys to give bland gifts to Jewish boys and girls. He is asked to fill in when Santa falls ill on Christmas Eve.

On February 15, 2015, on the Saturday Night Live 40th Anniversary Special, he was named by Steve Martin as one of the many SNL cast members who had died over the years, with the camera cutting to show Lovitz's reaction. Later, his image was seen in a montage of deceased SNL members, with the camera once again cutting to his now "outraged" reaction.

Television series
Lovitzs first stint as a regular in a situation comedy was that of Mole, an investigator for a New York City district attorneys office, in the short-lived 1985–86 series Foley Square, starring Margaret Colin.

Lovitz was a contestant on The New Celebrity Apprentice (also known as Celebrity Apprentice 8), playing for the charity St. Jude Children's Research Hospital. He was the sixth contestant fired, finishing in 11th place and raising $50,000 for his charity.

Voice work
Lovitz has lent his voice to several cartoons and films. In The Critic, he played the title character Jay Sherman (using his regular speaking voice). He has made several appearances on The Simpsons—as Marge's prom date Artie Ziff in "The Way We Was", the art teacher in "Brush with Greatness", theater director Llewellyn Sinclair and his sister who owned a daycare center in "A Streetcar Named Marge", Andre in "Homer's Triple Bypass", and numerous other appearances, including the character of Jay Sherman in the episode "A Star Is Burns", a crossover with The Critic. He was also the voice of Radio in the Hyperion-produced, Disney-distributed animated movie The Brave Little Toaster, and that of T.R. Chula the tarantula in Amblimation's An American Tail: Fievel Goes West.

Music
Lovitz performed a duet with Robbie Williams on Williams' album Swing When You're Winning (2001), in the song "Well, Did You Evah". He also performed on the TV series Two and a Half Men singing "Save the Orphans" and beating Charlie (Charlie Sheen) out of the award for best jingle writer.

Broadway theatre
He has appeared on Broadway at the Music Box Theatre in Neil Simon's play The Dinner Party, taking over the lead role from Henry Winkler. He sang at Carnegie Hall three times (including Great Performances' Ira Gershwin at 100: A Celebration at Carnegie Hall) and sang the national anthem at Dodger Stadium and the U.S. Open.

On October 10, 2001, Lovitz sang a duet (with Robbie Williams) of the song "Well, Did You Evah!" at the Royal Albert Hall. The recording can be found on the Swing When You're Winning album.

Commercial work
In the 1990's he was the voice for Red in commercials for M&M's.

Between 1999 and 2000 Lovitz appeared in a $33 million advertising campaign that featured a series of television commercials promoting the Yellow Pages. The comic premise was to present Lovitz as the Yellow Pages' author. One of them featured Lovitz saying, "The hardest thing to do is to come up with a simple idea that is also great. And I just thought, 'Oh, the alphabet!'"

In 2006, he became the spokesman in an advertising campaign for the Subway restaurant chain.

In 2020, Lovitz starred in commercials for Playology, a brand of toys for aging dogs. They featured him with disparaging puppies, asking for senior dogs to get their due.

Stand-up comedy
Lovitz began his stand-up career in 2003 at the Laugh Factory in Los Angeles.

Rift with Andy Dick
Lovitz experienced a long rift with former NewsRadio costar Andy Dick concerning the death of their mutual friend Phil Hartman. According to Lovitz, Dick gave Hartman's wife Brynn cocaine at a Christmas party at Hartman's house in 1997. Brynn, a recovering addict, began using drugs again, culminating in her killing Hartman and herself on May 28, 1998. When Lovitz joined the cast of NewsRadio as Hartman's replacement, he and Dick got into a heated argument in which Lovitz reportedly shouted "I wouldn't be here if you hadn't given Brynn coke in the first place." Lovitz later apologized to Dick for the remark.

In early 2007, Dick approached Lovitz at a restaurant and said "I put the Phil Hartman hex on you—you're the next to die." On July 10, 2007, Lovitz got into a physical altercation with Dick at the Laugh Factory in Los Angeles. Lovitz demanded an apology from Dick, who refused and accused Lovitz of blaming him for Hartman's death. Lovitz then smashed Dick's head into the bar.

The Jon Lovitz Comedy Club & Podcast Theatre
In 2009, The Jon Lovitz Comedy Club location on Universal CityWalk in Universal Studios Hollywood opened. A comic short film starring Ken Davitian and featuring Lovitz was filmed there, directed by Brent Roske and written by Aaron Davitian.

The Jon Lovitz Comedy Club in Universal Studios Hollywood was home to the first MMA Roasted standup comedy show in 2009.

On May 29, 2011, the name was changed to the Jon Lovitz Comedy Club & Podcast Theatre. A premiere event called Podammit was held, in which Kevin Smith hosted a variety of six podcasts, including Plus One 3D with his wife, Jennifer Schwalbach; Hollywood Babble-On with Ralph Garman; and Jay & Silent Bob Get Old with Jason Mewes; as well as The ABCs of SNL with Lovitz himself, a six-episode This Is Your Life-style biographical interview about Lovitz's life and career. The Club periodically hosted other podcasts such as Rob Paulsen's Talkin' Toons (which subsequently left in October 2013). The Jon Lovitz Comedy Club & Podcast Theater closed on November 5, 2014.

Personal life
Lovitz resides in Beverly Hills, California. He is friends with Sean Penn and Adam Sandler. He was also friends with Penny Marshall and Phil Hartman. He has described Hartman as "the big brother I always wanted".

Politically, Lovitz is a supporter of the Democratic Party. However, he was an outspoken critic of former President Barack Obama. He called Obama a "fucking asshole" and criticized him for claiming the rich did not pay their share of taxes. Lovitz said: "He had nothing … and the guy ends up being at Harvard. He's the president of the United States. And now he's like, 'Fuck me and everyone who made it like me'."

In June 2021, Lovitz criticized cancel culture and compared it to McCarthyism. He claimed that it made comedians' jobs increasingly difficult, saying, "If you don't have the ability to laugh at yourself, don't go to a comedy club," and "If you're watching TV and you don't like the show, change the channel. It's very simple."

Filmography

Film

Television

Web

Other work
 Comedy Central Roast of Bob Saget (2008) - Himself
 Comedy Central Roast of Charlie Sheen (2011) - Himself
 Cranium Command (1989) - Right Brain
 The Critic (webisodes) (2000–2001) - Jay Sherman

References

External links

 
 

1957 births
20th-century American comedians
20th-century American male actors
21st-century American comedians
21st-century American male actors
American male film actors
American male television actors
American male voice actors
American people of Hungarian-Jewish descent
American people of Romanian-Jewish descent
American people of Russian-Jewish descent
American podcasters
American sketch comedians
American stand-up comedians
Comedians from California
Jewish American male actors
Jewish American male comedians
Jewish male comedians
Living people
Male actors from Beverly Hills, California
Male actors from Los Angeles
Participants in American reality television series
People from Tarzana, Los Angeles
The Apprentice (franchise) contestants
University of California, Irvine alumni